Imam Khomeini International University (IKIU) is an international university in Iran that was founded after the Islamic Revolution. The bill of IKIU’s constitution was ratified by the Iranian Parliament in January 1984. Constituent organs of IKIU include Board of trustees, president, and council. Deputies for Education, Research, and Students and Culture are some of the other departments. In addition, there is a Science and Technology Park, and central library with more than 100000 books and magazines.

IKIU has formed the Brilliant-Talent students’ office to recognize top students and to support and guide the students, providing educational and welfare facilities. It has seven faculties. The Persian Language Teaching Center has hosted students from more than 96 countries, enjoying language labs, library, and computer site. Amirreza Vakilifard is the founding member of the first-ever Persian Language teaching department aimed at foreign learners in Iran. He has been teaching Persian language to foreign students since 1995 at the Imam Khomeini International University(IKIU) in Qazvin, Iran.

History
The university was established in 1991 to further culture, civilization, and thought of Muslim world. As an educational, research, and cultural institution under the Ministry of Science, Research and Technology, IKIU has the following aims:
 Furthering and promoting Islamic culture in the Muslim world 
 Propagating Islamic culture and thought and science and technology on an international scale 
 Introducing grand figures of the Muslim world with the purpose of consolidating Islamic culture 
 Taking advantage of innovations and developments in science and technology to the benefit of Iran and other Islamic countries 
 Training committed specialists with the purpose of making Islamic countries scientifically and culturally self-reliant 
 Contributing toward the development of higher education in Iran

Status
The university offers 30 undergraduate courses and 13 master courses with a faculty of 183 staff teachers. There are 5489 undergraduates and 1281 graduate students. According to Four-Year Development Plan, five undergraduate courses, 17 master courses, and five PhD courses will be added to the programs of study.

The university admits international students. A total of 200 to 250 international students are admitted into the Center for Teaching Persian to non-natives each year.

Since not all of the academic levels and programs of study required by such students are available in IKIU and because the number of international applicants is on the rise, some international students will be referred to other leading universities in the country to continue their studies after they complete Persian language and pre-university courses.

500 international students from 55 countries are doing their 22 undergraduate and graduate courses at IKIU. Country-wide, around 5000 such students are doing humanities, engineering, science, and medicine.

Campus
The main campus of Imam Khomeini International University is in Qazvin, Iran. There is a Science and Technology Park near the main campus. A residential complex is near the main campus.

Buildings

Main Campus
Faculty of Science (Page)
Faculty of Engineering and Technology (Page)
Faculty of Literature and Humanity Sciences (Page)
Faculty of Islamic Sciences and Researches (Page)
Faculty of Social Sciences (Page)
Faculty of Architecture and Urban Development (Page)
Faculty of Futures Studies
Central Library
Central Hall
Professional laboratories
Restaurant
Mosque
Sports hall

Residential complex
Persian Language Center (Page)
Dormitories
Sports hall
Soccer field

Faculty and alumni

Chancellors
*Unfinished because of Islamic Revolution

Notable faculty
 Abdolkarim Soroush, as professor of Islamic Philosophy, before leaving the country
 Abolhassan Naeini, associated professor of Civil engineering
Amirreza Vakilifard, prominent second language educationalist
 Saeid Abbasbandy, professor of mathematics
 Hassan Esmati, teacher of theology and former Iran's cultural attaché in Tunisia
 Alireza Shokouhi, Iranian prominent hydrologist
 Hossein Abadian, professor of Iran's contemporary history

Notable alumni
 Narges Mohammadi, Iranian human rights activist

See also
List of Iranian Research Centers
List of colleges and universities
Higher education in Iran
Buein Zahra Technical University
Academy of Gundishapur
List of Iranian scientists from the pre-modern era.
Modern Iranian scientists and engineers
Education in Iran
National Library of Iran
Sarad
Simorq

References

External links
IKIU Photo gallery
Official website
Official bzte website
English website
Arabic website

 
Educational institutions established in 1991
Education in Qazvin Province
Buildings and structures in Qazvin Province
1991 establishments in Iran